Birth dearth is a neologism referring to falling fertility rates.  In the late 1980s, the term was used in the context of American and European society.  The use of the term has since been expanded to include many other industrialized nations. It is often cited as a response to overpopulation, but is not incompatible with it. The term was coined by Ben Wattenberg in his 1987 book of the same name.
Countries and geographic regions that are currently experiencing falling population include Russia, Europe, Japan, and populations of people of these descents in other countries such as in the United States.

Russia 
Russia is often mentioned in articles concerning birth dearth because of its rapidly declining population, and the proposal by Vladimir Putin to offer women additional benefits for having more children. It is predicted that should current trends continue, Russia's population will be an estimated 111 million in 2050, compared with 147 million in 2000, according to the UN World Population Prospects report (2004 Revision, medium variant).

Europe 

Europe is one of the major geographic regions in the World that is expected to decline in population in the coming years. Europe's population is forecast to decline by nearly 70 million people by 2050, as the total fertility rate has remained perpetually below the replacement rate. (Further information: Sub-replacement fertility and Population decline)

See also 
 Aging of Japan
 Decreţei
 Demographic transition
 Natalism
 Nationalist
 Tax on childlessness
 Population control
 Reproductive rights

References

External links 
"Birth Dearth", Michael Meyer, Newsweek, September 27, 2004 
"Behind the Birth Dearth", Robert J. Samuelson, The Washington Post, May 24, 2006

Population
Fertility
Population decline